Oded Regev may refer to:
 Oded Regev (computer scientist), Israeli-American theoretical computer scientist and mathematician
 Oded Regev (physicist) (born 1946), physicist and astrophysicist